Zhejiang Wanli University, formerly the Ningbo Branch of Zhejiang Agricultural University, is a private college in Ningbo, Zhejiang, China. 

Previously holding vocational technical college status, the institution was granted college status in 2002. Despite its English name, the institution has not yet been granted university status. 

In ARWU Rankings 2022, the institution ranked 369th in China.

History 
In 1958, the Ningbo Regional Agricultural Vocational School was established.

In 1960, it merged with Ningbo Regional Institute of Agricultural Sciences and Ningbo Regional Agricultural Tools Research Institute to form Ningbo Agricultural College.

In 1961, it was renamed Ningbo Regional Agricultural Vocational School.

In 1971, it merged with Ningbo Forestry School to form Ningbo Regional Agriculture and Forestry School.

In 1976, Ningbo Regional Agriculture and Forestry School was upgraded to Ningbo Regional Agricultural College.

In 1977, the Ningbo Regional Agricultural College was transformed into the Ningbo Branch of Zhejiang Agricultural University.

In 1984, the Ningbo Branch of Zhejiang Agricultural University was transformed into Zhejiang Rural Technical Teachers College.

In 1999, Zhejiang Rural Technical Teachers School was granted vocational technical college status and was renamed Zhejiang Wanli Vocational and Technical College.

In 2002, the institution was granted college status, was renamed "Zhejiang Wanli College" in Chinese, and started to provide bachelor's degree programs.

In 2021, the institution was accredited for three master's degree programs.

Schools 
 School of Business
 School of Law
 Faculty of Culture and Communication
 Faculty of Foreign Languages
 Faculty of Design and Architecture
 Faculty of Biological and Environmental Sciences
 Faculty of Electronic and Information Engineering
 Faculty of Computer Science and Information Technology
 Junior College
 Continuing Education College 
 World College

International co-operation
State University of New York at Plattsburgh (USA)
Kent State University (USA)
Idaho State University (USA)
Paris 12 Val de Marne University (France)
Saint-Louis University, Brussels (Belgium)

References

External links

   
 Official website  

1999 establishments in China
Education in Ningbo
Educational institutions established in 1999
Medical schools in China
Universities and colleges in Zhejiang
Universities in China with English-medium medical schools